Innovative Research Universities (IRU), formerly Innovative Research Universities Australia, is a network of eight comprehensive universities in Australia.

The main purpose of the group is to undertake advocacy on issues related to higher education policy, research and university students.

The IRU has eight university members: Charles Darwin University, James Cook University, Griffith University, La Trobe University, Flinders University, Murdoch University, Western Sydney University and the University of Canberra. Between them, the universities enrol over 238,000 students including around 55,000 international students.

The IRU is one of the four main university groupings in Australia. The other groups are Australian Technology Network, Group of Eight and Regional Universities Network.

History 
In 2003, a group of universities sharing common origins established the Innovative Research Universities a collaborative network to enhance the outcomes of higher education. The members were established as research-intensive universities during the 1960s and 1970s, a dynamic period characterised by massive expansion in higher education and extensive innovation in educational design and delivery – hence, the network name of ‘Innovative Research Universities’.

The founding six universities were: Flinders University, Griffith University, La Trobe University, Macquarie University, Murdoch University and The University of Newcastle. James Cook University joined in 2007, followed by Charles Darwin University in 2009. These additions were balanced as first Macquarie (2008) and then Newcastle (2014) left the group to pursue their future independently. In 2017, Western Sydney University joined, followed by the University of Canberra in 2021.

Members

Research
All members of the IRU are ranked between 170 and 540 in the Times Higher Education World University Rankings 2021. Five IRU universities are also ranked in the global top 100 in the Times Higher Education Impact Ranking 2021. The group collectively attracts A$415 million per annum in research funding from national research agencies, industry and public sector agencies including local and state governments. The members are core partners in half of all Australian Co-operative Research Centres (CRCs). The CRC Program links researchers with industry and government, and emphasises research application.

Map

See also
Universities in Australia
Universities Australia
Australian Technology Network
Golden Triangle (English universities)
C9 League, alliance of top universities in China
National Institutes of Technology (Indian engineering universities)
Group of Eight
Regional Universities Network

References

External links

College and university associations and consortia in Australia